Telman Mardanovich Ismailov (born 26 October 1956) is an Azerbaijani-born businessman and entrepreneur of Mountain Jewish origin. Since Azerbaijan does not allow dual citizenship, he holds Russian-Turkish citizenship. He is the chairman of the Russian AST Group of companies, which is active in many countries. Until 2009, Ismailov owned the Europe's then-largest marketplace, Cherkizovsky Market, located in Moscow, Russia.

Early life and family
Telman Ismailov was born in Baku, USSR in 1956, to a business family from Baku. He is the tenth of 12 children. Both his father's and mother's family include Muslims and Mountain Jews.

Business career
In 1989, he registered the brand "AST" (initials of his two sons (Alekper, Sarkhan) and himself).

After the lavish opening of a hotel resort in Antalya, Russia's prime minister Vladimir Putin was reportedly enraged that Ismailov invested so much abroad and flaunted his riches while Russia was being hit by a credit crunch. In retaliation, the angry Putin ordered the closing of Cherkizovsky Market in 2009, causing 100,000 traders at the famous bazaar to lose their jobs.

Lifestyle
Known for his extravagant lifestyle, Ismailov is famous for spending millions of dollars on singers like Jennifer Lopez, Mariah Carey, Tom Jones, and others. Ismailov paid Lopez $1.4 million for her to sing 10 minutes' worth of songs. The video of her singing "Happy Birthday" song to him is available on YouTube. Ismailov befriended plenty of other celebrities such as Sharon Stone, Richard Gere, Monica Bellucci, Paris Hilton, and numerous other performers just to appear at his lavish parties.

References

External links
 AST Group – Official Site 

1956 births
Living people
Azerbaijani billionaires
Azerbaijani businesspeople
Azerbaijani Jews
Mountain Jews
Russian football chairmen and investors
Russian Jews
Russian people of Azerbaijani descent
Russian people of Jewish descent
Turkish people of Azerbaijani descent
Turkish people of Jewish descent
Azerbaijani investors
Azerbaijan State University of Economics alumni